The 1997 Pennzoil 200 was the ninth round of the 1996–1997 Indy Racing League. The race was held on August 17, 1997 at the  New Hampshire International Speedway in Loudon, New Hampshire.

Qualifying

  Didn't qualify because of handling issues. He was allowed to start the race at the back of the field.
  Changed his Riley & Scott chassis, which was making its debut, for a Dallara chassis and was demoted to the back of the field. 
  Couldn't qualify after his chassis had been damaged in a practice crash. He was allowed to start the race at the back of the field.

Failed to qualify or withdrew 
 Mike Groff for Byrd-Cunningham Racing - crashed during Friday's second practice session and was hospitalised with a concussion. Replaced by  Johnny Unser.
 Greg Ray R for Knapp Motorsports - his team withdrew on Saturday morning, prior to qualifying and not having completed a single lap in practice, in order to prepare for the Las Vegas race.

Race recap

The first 10 laps were run almost entirely under caution, after a spin by Robbie Groff and a gearbox failure for Jim Guthrie on the opening lap and a botched restart when Jimmy Kite spun coming off turn 4. Once racing finally got started, unexpected pole sitter Marco Greco was strong in the lead but he handed it over to Scott Goodyear on lap 35 when he pitted under caution after a crash by Sam Schmidt. On lap 63, a broken oil line fitting made him spin off turn 4 and the resulting caution and pit stop by Goodyear allowed Eliseo Salazar to take the lead, which he maintained. Not long after the restart, Buddy Lazier also spun on the tricky turn 4, bringing out the fifth caution in less than 70 laps. 

Meanwhile, Eddie Cheever who started from 18th spot, moved into second place by lap 40 and assumed the lead on lap 96 when Salazar pitted under caution after a crash by Affonso Giaffone. Cheever held the lead until the next round of pit stops, starting on lap 133. Buhl had remained in the top 10 since early in the race, running in the top 5 most of the time. Goodyear's engine failed on lap 153, bringing out another caution and a round of pit stops that shuffled the field. The then-leader, Kenny Bräck, had a slow pit stop, while Stéphan Grégoire, who was running second, suffered a mechanical failure.

Cheever took over the lead again after the green, followed by Buhl. Both had gambled on stopping earlier, strategy that paid off due to the caution, as they were able to stretch his fuel load to the finish, running very close to each other. But on the second-to-last lap Cheever's gearbox failed, slowing abruptly on the backstretch. Buhl had to slow significantly too to avoid a crash and Vincenzo Sospiri rapidly made up a gap of several seconds. On the last lap, Buhl encountered heavy traffic on the backstretch. Sospiri, with less worn tires, avoided it by running high, came off turn 4 nose to tail with Buhl, and made it side by side to the finish line, but Buhl won by a nose. Robbie Buhl, coming off an injury suffered at Pikes Peak, took the closest victory in IRL history. Buhl survived a race of attrition that saw several drivers suffer mechanical failures while leading.

With only one race left in the calendar, Tony Stewart slightly increased his advantage in the championship. Despite blowing his engine with 26 laps to go in what already was a difficult weekend (having only qualified in 14th place and never being able to contend for the top spots), he got 3 more points than Davey Hamilton, who also had engine troubles 53 laps earlier. Hamilton was the only driver with mathematical chances to beat Stewart, as Cheever was 38 points behind the leader.

Box score

Race Statistics
Lead changes: 12 among 9 drivers

Standings after the race
Drivers' Championship standings

 Note: Only the top five positions are included for the standings.

References

External links
IndyCar official website

1996–97 in IndyCar
1997 in sports in New Hampshire
Motorsport in New Hampshire